The R1 (internally called XCON, for eXpert CONfigurer) program was a production-rule-based system written in OPS5 by John P. McDermott of CMU in 1978 to assist in the ordering of DEC's VAX computer systems by automatically selecting the computer system components based on the customer's requirements.

Overview
In developing the system, McDermott made use of experts from both DEC's PDP/11 and VAX computer systems groups. These experts sometimes even disagreed amongst themselves as to an optimal configuration. The resultant "sorting it out" had an additional benefit in terms of the quality of VAX systems delivered.

XCON first went into use in 1980 in DEC's plant in Salem, New Hampshire. It eventually had about 2500 rules. By 1986, it had processed 80,000 orders, and achieved 95–98% accuracy. It was estimated to be saving DEC $25M a year by reducing the need to give customers free components when technicians made errors, by speeding the assembly process, and by increasing customer satisfaction.

Before XCON, when ordering a VAX from DEC, every cable, connection, and bit of software had to be ordered separately. (Computers and peripherals were not sold complete in boxes as they are today.) The sales people were not always very technically expert, so customers would find that they had hardware without the correct cables, printers without the correct drivers, a processor without the correct language chip, and so on. This meant delays and caused a lot of customer dissatisfaction and resultant legal action. XCON interacted with the sales person, asking critical questions before printing out a coherent and workable system specification/order slip.

XCON's success led DEC to rewrite XCON as XSEL—a version of XCON intended for use by DEC's salesforce to aid a customer in properly configuring their VAX (so they would not, say, choose a computer too large to fit through their doorway or choose too few cabinets for the components to fit in). Location problems and configuration were handled by yet another expert system, XSITE.

McDermott's 1980 paper on R1 won the AAAI Classic Paper Award in 1999. Legendarily, the name of R1 comes from McDermott, who supposedly said as he was writing it, "Three years ago I couldn't spell knowledge engineer, now I are one."

See also
 MYCIN

References

The AI Business: The commercial uses of artificial intelligence, ed. Patrick Winston and Karen A. Prendergast.

External links
"Configuration with R1/XCon (1978)"
"AAAI Classic Paper Award"
"R1-SOAR: A Research Experiment in Computer Learning"

Expert systems
Business software
Information systems
History of artificial intelligence